Te Aro was a parliamentary electorate in Wellington, New Zealand from 1881 to 1890. It covered the southern area of the central business district. During the three parliamentary terms of its existence, the electorate was represented by three Members of Parliament.

Population centres
The previous electoral redistribution was undertaken in 1875 for the 1875–1876 election. In the six years since, New Zealand's European population had increased by 65%. In the 1881 electoral redistribution, the House of Representatives increased the number of European representatives to 91 (up from 84 since the 1875–76 election). The number of Māori electorates was held at four. The House further decided that electorates should not have more than one representative, which led to 35 new electorates being formed, including Te Aro, and two electorates that had previously been abolished to be recreated. This necessitated a major disruption to existing boundaries.

The electorate was based on the inner suburb of Te Aro, which is located in the southern end of the central business district. In the 1887 electoral redistribution, the Te Aro electorate lost much of its southern area to the newly formed  electorate. In the 1890 electoral redistribution, the Te Aro electorate was abolished, and the area became part of the three-member  electorate.

History
The Te Aro electorate was represented by three Members of Parliament:
Charles Johnston from 1881 to 1887 (resigned)
Francis Humphris Fraser in 1887 (defeated)
Andrew Agnew Stuart Menteath from 1887 to 1890 (retired)

Members of Parliament
Unless otherwise stated, all MPs terms began and ended at a general election.

Key

Election results

1887 election

1887 by-election

1884 election

1881 election

Notes

References

Historical electorates of New Zealand
Politics of the Wellington Region
1881 establishments in New Zealand
1890 disestablishments in New Zealand